Commemorations are a type of religious observance in the many Churches of the Anglican Communion, including the Church of England. They are the least significant type of observance, the others being Principal Feasts, Principal Holy Days, Festivals, and Lesser Festivals. Whereas Principal Feasts must be celebrated, it is not obligatory to observe Commemorations. They are always attached to a calendar date, and are not observed if they fall on a Sunday, in Holy Week, or in Easter Week. In Common Worship Commemorations are not provided with collects or indications of liturgical colour. However, they may be celebrated as Lesser Festivals if local pastoral conditions suggest it.

Examples of Commemorations in the Church of England
10 January: William Laud, Archbishop of Canterbury 1633- 1645
18 January: Amy Carmichael, Founder of the Dohnavur Fellowship, spiritual writer, 1951
20 January: Richard Rolle of Hampole, Spiritual Writer, 1349
10 February: Scholastica, sister of Benedict, Abbess, c 543
8 March: Felix, Bishop, Apostle to the East Angles, 647
24 April: Mellitus, Bishop of London, first Bishop of St Paul's, 624
16 May: Caroline Chisholm, Social Reformer, 1877
3 June: The Martyrs of Uganda, 1885–1887 and 1977
20 July: Margaret of Antioch, Martyr, 4th century
11 August: John Henry Newman, Priest, Tractarian, 1890
1 September: Giles of Provence, Hermit, c 710
12 October: Edith Cavell, b.4 December 1865 d.12 October 1915, British nurse and patriot
25 October: Crispin and Crispinian, Martyrs at Rome, c 287
14 November: Samuel Seabury, first Anglican Bishop in North America, 1796
1 December: Charles de Foucauld, Hermit in the Sahara, 1916

See also

List of Anglican Church calendars

Church of England festivals